Saltukova  is a belde (town) in Çaycuma district of Zonguldak Province, Turkey. The population of Saltukova is 3886  as of 2010. The name of the town was mentioned in a 16th-century Ottoman documents as Arz'ı Saltuk or Saltukeli. After the construction of Ankara-Zonguldak railroad in 1939, the population of the settlement was increased. During the Second World War a military airport was constructed in Saltukova. Although it was abandoned after the war, in 2009 it was renewed and put into service as Zonguldak Airport. In 1988, the settlement was declared as a seat of township. A natural gas thermal plant is planned to be constructed in Saltukova.

References

Populated places in Zonguldak Province
Çaycuma
Towns in Turkey